Elm City Municipal Historic District is a national historic district located at Elm City, Wilson County, North Carolina.  It encompasses 85 contributing buildings in the railroad town of Lucama.  The district developed between about 1873 to 1930 and includes notable examples of Classical Revival, Early Commercial, and Victorian style architecture. Notable buildings include the Batts & Williams Store (1884), G. A. Barnes Store (1912), Dawes Building (1914), Elm City Bank (1920s), Holden House (c. 1875), A. C. Dixon House, G. A. Barnes House (c. 1895-1905), W. G. Sharpe House (c. 1911), Dr. Robert Putney, Sr., House (c. 1919-1920), and L. C. Cobb House (1927).

It was listed on the National Register of Historic Places in 1986.

References

Historic districts on the National Register of Historic Places in North Carolina
Neoclassical architecture in North Carolina
Victorian architecture in North Carolina
Geography of Wilson County, North Carolina
National Register of Historic Places in Wilson County, North Carolina